Silvia Baraldini (December 12, 1947) is an Italian activist. She was active in both the Black Power and Puerto Rican independence movements in the United States in the 1960s, 1970s, and 1980s. In 1982 she was sentenced to 43 years under the Racketeer Influenced and Corrupt Organizations Act (RICO) for conspiring to commit two armed robberies, driving a secondary getaway car during the prison break of murder convict and fellow political activist Assata Shakur (a.k.a. Joanne Chesimard) and for contempt of court for refusing to testify before a Grand Jury that was investigating the activities of the Puerto Rican independence movement.

Although the government sustained that her sentence was appropriate given the serious nature of her crimes, her supporters argued that her harsh sentence was due to her unpopular political beliefs. Baraldini was imprisoned in numerous high-security facilities in the United States, including the notorious basement unit of a Federal Prison in Lexington, Kentucky which housed two other women, Susan Rosenberg and Alejandrina Torres, also convicted of politically motivated crimes. The unit was sharply criticized by Amnesty International and its closure was eventually ordered by U.S. District Judge Barrington Parker.

After being transferred to Italy in 1999 to serve the remainder of her sentence, she was released on September 26, 2006, thanks to a pardon law approved in the previous months by the Italian Parliament. Italian journalist Lucio Manisco acted in favor of Silvia Baraldini's extradition; he was then a foreign correspondent of the Italian public television channel Rai 3 (1987–1992).

Early life
Baraldini was born in Rome, Italy. In 1961, at the age of fourteen, she moved to the United States with her parents. Her father was initially employed by Olivetti, but was subsequently employed as a civilian with the Italian embassy in Washington, D.C.

She later attended the University of Wisconsin–Madison where she became a political activist.

Arrest and conviction
On November 9, 1982, she was arrested and in September 1983 convicted for multiple crimes:

 For racketeering and conspiracy under the Racketeer Influenced and Corrupt Organizations Act (RICO) statutes for her participation in the Black Liberation Army.
 For conspiring to commit two armored truck robberies.
 For her involvement in the prison break of New Jersey murder convict and Black Liberation Army leading figure Assata Shakur, a.k.a. Joanne Chesimard.
 For contempt of court after refusing to surrender the names of members of the May 19th Communist Movement.

She was convicted and sentenced to 43 years: 20 years for assisting in the prison break of a convicted murderer, 20 years for criminal conspiracy, and 3 years for criminal contempt. Baraldini's conviction and sentence were affirmed by the unanimous United States Court of Appeals for the Second Circuit in March 1985.

Her conviction sparked a campaign in her native Italy, supported mainly by leftist parties and movements, who protested what they saw as the disproportionate length of her sentence, which was perceived as politically motivated, particularly for the part regarding the sentence to 3 years for "criminal contempt", which they claimed infringed on the "right to remain silent" of the accused enshrined in all major European criminal codes. Notable from this respect is the famous Italian singer Francesco Guccini's song "Canzone per Silvia", expressing solidarity with the prisoner in view of freedom of thought and general condemnation of the prison system, addressed to the United States as a nation. Amongst those who also intervened in her favor were Noam Chomsky, Roberto Benigni, Dario Fo, Luis Sepulveda, Amnesty International and the American Civil Liberties Union.

The fact that, had she been convicted in Italy of the same crimes and found guilty, she would not have been sentenced to more than a maximum of 25 years in prison was another point of contention between her supporters and detractors.

In 1989 Nina Rosenblum directed a documentary "Through the Wire" on the three imprisoned women Susan Rosenberg, Silvia Baraldini and Alejandrina Torres, narrated by Susan Sarandon.

In 2009, Margo Pelletier & Lisa Thomas of Thin Edge Films released the documentary "Freeing Silvia Baraldini" about the life and radical politics surrounding Silvia's life.

Prison
She was transferred to several prisons including Federal Correctional Institution at Danbury, Connecticut, and at the Federal Correctional Institution at Dublin, California, and the High Security Unit at the Federal Medical Center, Lexington.

Repatriation
On August 24, 1999, upon an agreement reached between the Department of Justice and the Italian Ministry of Justice (headed at the time by Mr. Oliviero Diliberto, a member of the Party of Italian Communists), she was transferred to Italy to serve the remainder of her sentence. She was greeted at the airport by the historic Italian communist leader, Armando Cossutta. The terms of the transfer called for her to remain in Italian prison until March 2008. In 2001, as she was undergoing treatment for breast cancer, she was released on house arrest, and permitted to work for the City of Rome between 9 a.m. to 2 p.m each day. She was released from detention on September 26, 2006, thanks to a general pardon law approved in the previous months by the Italian Parliament. That happened despite the agreement with the Government of the United States which stated that she had to remain in prison until 2008.

See also
Brink's robbery (1981)

Bibliography
 E. Mancinelli, Il caso Baraldini, Datanews, 1995, 
 G. Bugani, Liberate Silvia (DVD + Libro), Bacchilega Editore, 2005,

References

External links

 Department of Justice statement regarding the transfer of Silvia Baraldini
 American Terrorism Study: Patterns of Behavior, Investigation and Prosecution of American Terrorists

1947 births
Activists for African-American civil rights
American prisoners and detainees
Anti–Vietnam War activists
Living people
Criminals from Rome
Italian expatriates in the United States